The Diocese of Dunkeld may refer to:

Diocese of Dunkeld, one of the 13 historical dioceses of the Scottish church
Roman Catholic Diocese of Dunkeld, modern Roman Catholic diocese resurrected in the late 19th century upon the model of the old diocese, but based at Dundee
Diocese of St Andrews, Dunkeld and Dunblane, Scottish episcopal created in the 18th century on the model of three earlier dioceses combined, and based at Perth